Alfa System is a video game development and planning company from Kumamoto City, Japan. The company was founded in 1988. In their early years Alfa System developed exclusively for NEC consoles with Hudson Soft and other publishers. They later worked closely with Sony Computer Entertainment and Bandai Namco on the Tales of series. In February 2021, Alfa System was acquired by Meteorise.

Games

Note

References

Video game companies of Japan
Video game companies established in 1988
Video game development companies
Japanese companies established in 1988
Companies based in Kumamoto Prefecture
Kumamoto